Selorm is a given name. Notable people with the name include:

Selorm Adadevoh, Ghanaian business executive
Selorm Geraldo (born 1996), Ghanaian footballer
Selorm Kuadey (1987–2012), English rugby union player

African given names